Arnold Lobel was a children's author and illustrator. He wrote:
 A Zoo for Mister Muster, in Lobel's Mister Muster series (1962), Lobel's first self-written and illustrated book
 A Holiday for Mister Muster, in Lobel's Mister Muster series (1963)
 Prince Bertram the Bad (1963)
 Giant John (1964)
 Lucille (1964)
 The Bears of the Air (1965)
 Martha the Movie Mouse (1966)
 The Comic Adventures of Old Mother Hubbard and Her Dog (1968)
 The Great Blueness and Other Predicaments (1968)
 Small Pig (1969)
 Ice-Cream Cone Coot, and Other Rare Birds (1971)
 On the Day Peter Stuyvesant Sailed Into Town (1971)
 Owl at Home (1975)
 Grasshopper on the Road (1978)
 A Treeful of Pigs (1979)
 Fables (1980) (A Caldecott Medal winner)
 Uncle Elephant (1981)
 Ming Lo Moves the Mountain (1982)
 The Book of Pigericks: Pig Limericks (1983)
 The Rose in My Garden (1984)
 Whiskers & Rhymes (1985)
 Odd Owls & Stout Pigs: A Book of Nonsense (2009), color by Adrianne Lobel

Frog and Toad series 
A series of books featuring Frog and Toad
 Frog and Toad Are Friends (1970)
 Frog and Toad Together (1972)
 Frog and Toad All Year (1976)
 Days with Frog and Toad (1979)
 The Frogs and Toads All Sang (2009), color by Adrianne Lobel

Mouse series 
 Mouse Tales (1972)
 Mouse Soup (1977) (Garden State Children's Book Award winner)

As illustrator

 Happy Times with Holiday Rhymes (1958) by Tamar Grand, a coloring and activity book about Jewish holidays
 My First Book of Prayers (1958) by Edythe Scharfstein, Sol Scharfstein, Ezekiel Schloss
 The Book of Chanukah Poems, Riddles, Stories, Songs, Things to Do (1959) by Edythe Scharfstein and Ezekial Schloss
 The Complete Book of Hanukkah (1959) by Kinneret Chiel
 Holidays are Nice: Around the Year with the Jewish Child (1960) by Robert Garvey and Ezekiel Schloss
 Red Tag Comes Back (1961) by Fred Phleger
 Something Old Something New (1961) by Susan Rhinehart
 Little Runner of the Longhouse (1962) by Betty Baker
 The Secret Three (1963) by Mildred Myrick
 Miss Suzy (1964) by Miriam Young
 Dudley Pippin (1965) by Phil Ressner
 The Witch on the Corner (1966) by Felice Holman
 The Star Thief (1968) by Andrea DiNoto
 Ants Are Fun (1969) by Mildred Myrick
 I'll Fix Anthony (1969) by Judith Viorst
 Hansel and Gretel (1971) by The Brothers Grimm
 As I Was Crossing Boston Common (1973) by Norma Farber
 The Clay Pot Boy (1974) by Cynthia Jameson
 Gregory Griggs and Other Nursery Rhyme People (1978)
 The Random House Book of Mother Goose (1986)
 Sing a Song of Popcorn: Every Child's Book of Poems (1988) by Beatrice Schenk de Regniers

Written by Millicent E. Selsam
A series of Science I Can Read Books all written by Millicent E. Selsam and illustrated by Arnold Lobel:
 Greg's Microscope (1963)
 Terry and the Caterpillars (1963)
 Let's Get Turtles (1965)
 Benny's Animals and How He Put Them in Order]] (1966)

Written by Jack Prelutsky
Books that Arnold Lobel illustrated for Jack Prelutsky:
 The Terrible Tiger (1970)
 Circus (1974)
 Nightmares: Poems to Trouble Your Sleep (1976)
 The Mean Old Mean Hyena (1978)
 The Headless Horseman Rides Tonight: More Poems to Trouble Your Sleep (1980)
 The Random House Book of Poetry for Children (1983)
 Tyrannosaurus Was a Beast: Dinosaur Poems (1988)

Written by Nathaniel Benchley
Books that Arnold Lobel illustrated for Nathaniel Benchley:
 Red Fox and His Canoe (1964)
 Oscar Otter (1966)
 The Strange Disappearance of Arthur Cluck (1967)
 Sam the Minuteman (1969)

Written by Peggy Parish
Books that Arnold Lobel illustrated for Peggy Parish:
 Let's Be Indians (1962)
 Let's Be Early Settlers with Daniel Boone (1967)
 Dinosaur Time (1974)

Written by Lilian Moore
Books that Arnold Lobel illustrated for Lilian Moore:
 The Magic Spectacles and Other Easy-to-Read Stories (1965)
 Junk Day on Juniper Street and Other Easy-to-Read Stories (1969)

Written by Edward Lear
Books that Arnold Lobel illustrated for Edward Lear:
 The Four Little Children Who Went Around the World (1968)
 The New Vestments (1970)

Written by Charlotte Zolotow
Books that Arnold Lobel illustrated for Charlotte Zolotow:
 The Quarreling Book (1963)
 Someday (1965)

Written by Jean van Leeuwen
Books that Arnold Lobel illustrated for Jean van Leeuwen:
 Tales of Oliver Pig (1979)
 More Tales of Oliver Pig (1981)

References

Bibliographies by writer
Bibliographies of American writers
Children's literature bibliographies